Anshun West railway station is a railway station of Hangchangkun Passenger Railway located in Guizhou, People's Republic of China.

See also
Anshun railway station

Railway stations in Guizhou